Boardwalk Real Estate Investment Trust is an open-ended real estate investment trust that owns Boardwalk Communities, Structures Metropolitaines, and Boardwalk Retirement Community.

Overview
The company owns a mixture of high-rise, mid-rise and low-rise apartment buildings in the provinces of Alberta, Saskatchewan, British Columbia, Ontario and Quebec. Boardwalk owns 260 properties with 36,418 units totalling approximately 31 million net rentable square feet. The company is listed on the Toronto Stock Exchange and as of May 5, 2020, it had a market capitalization of approximately $1.7 billion dollars.

The majority of Nuns' Island in Montreal is owned by Boardwalk through Structures Metropolitaines.

See also
List of real estate companies of Canada

References

External links

Toronto Real Estate Guide
Investors Page at Boardwalk REIT

Companies listed on the Toronto Stock Exchange
Real estate companies of Canada
Companies based in Calgary
Real estate investment trusts of Canada
Real estate companies established in 1984
1984 establishments in Canada
Financial services companies based in Alberta